The United States competed at the 1906 Intercalated Games in Athens, Greece. 38 athletes, all men, competed in 28 events in 5 sports.

Athletics

Track

Field

Diving

Swimming

Tennis

Wrestling

Greco-Roman

References

Nations at the 1906 Intercalated Games
1906
Intercalated Games